The , signed as Route 16, is one of the routes of the Hanshin Expressway system serving the Keihanshin area.

See also

References

External links

Roads in Osaka Prefecture
16
1965 establishments in Japan